Hwang Il-su (Hangul: 황일수; born 8 August 1987) is a South Korean football player who plays for Gyeongnam FC as a midfielder.

Club career
Hwang was a draftee pick for Daegu FC from Dong-A University for the 2010 season. Since the beginning of the season, he has been a regular in the first team, making his debut against Gwangju Sangmu on 27 February 2010. Hwang scored his first professional  goal against Gangwon FC on 2 May 2010, and went on to score a second in the 1–2 away loss to Chunnam Dragons on 7 November 2010. During the 2010 season, he played in 31 games in all competitions, scoring 4 goals.  Hwang stayed with Daegu for 2011, and scored Daegu's opening goal of the season in the club's 2–3 away loss to Gwangju FC on 5 March 2011.

Hwang transferred to Chinese Super League side Yanbian Funde on a two-year contract on 10 July 2017.

Club career statistics

References

External links

 

1987 births
Living people
Association football forwards
South Korean footballers
South Korea international footballers
Daegu FC players
Jeju United FC players
Gimcheon Sangmu FC players
Yanbian Funde F.C. players
Ulsan Hyundai FC players
K League 1 players
K League 2 players
Chinese Super League players
Expatriate footballers in China
South Korean expatriate sportspeople in China
Sportspeople from Busan